Timothy Cubbison is an American producer, director, writer and casting director, best known for the video games Fallout 4, Life Is Strange and Rise of the Tomb Raider. He is credited on over 50 titles including four BAFTA winners, five DICE Awards winners, five Game Critics Awards winners, and five Game Developers Choice Awards winners.

Education
Cubbison graduated from Ramstein American High School in Germany.  He earned a B.S. in Radio-Television-Film from the University of Texas at Austin and an M.B.A. from the USC Marshall School of Business.

Career 
He is the founder of the voice recording studio Horseless Cowboy.

Theatre 
Cubbison directed the world premieres of two plays, Kicking Gravity and Out of Gardenia.  The plays, which were produced by Cubbison and Adam Agardy, were the winners of the Hired Gun Playwrighting competition.

Video games 
Cubbison served as a voice producer on Fallout 3 and a voice director on CSI: NY. He received his first writing credit with work on Infamous and began working as casting director with Command and Conquer 4: Tiberium Twilight. He has worked with Mickey Rourke, Kris Kristofferson, Sigourney Weaver, Laurence Fishburne and Samuel L. Jackson.

Film 
His short films and documentaries were played at film festivals in the United States, Germany and New Zealand.  In 2016, the German language film, Ich Warte Hier, directed by Harry Buerkle won the award for Best Documentary at the Bamberger Kurzfilmtage. It was distributed by Amazon Prime Video.

Writing and conferences 
He is a contributor to Forbes.com and the editor of the Horseless Cowboy Medium publication  He speaks at schools like USC and conferences like M-Dev.  He was an organizer of the 2017 E2 conference and the 2016 E2VR conference at the University of Southern California.

Credits

Notes

American film producers
Living people
Marshall School of Business alumni
Moody College of Communication alumni
Year of birth missing (living people)